Rhythmologa bicuspis is a species of moth of the family Tortricidae. It is found in Peru.

The wingspan is 22 mm. The ground colour of the forewings is cream, tinged with brownish basally and dorsally and with some concolorous dots. The hindwings are cream tinged with brownish on the periphery.

Etymology
The species name refers to the presence of two thorns of the valve and is derived from Latin bi (meaning twice, double) and cuspis (meaning a blade).

References

Moths described in 2010
Euliini